Zhenya Wang (born 20 January 1981), also known as Dio Wang, is a former Australian senator and civil engineer. He was the CEO of Australasian Resources from July 2010 until 20 June 2014, when he resigned in preparation for his role as Senator for Western Australia (WA). He did not retain his seat at the 2016 double dissolution election recording 0.38% of the WA primary senate vote.

Early life
Wang was born in Nanjing, China, where he studied civil engineering at Southeast University.

Wang migrated to Australia in 2003, and has been an Australian citizen since 2009. He studied at the University of Melbourne, where he earned a Postgraduate Diploma in Planning and Design (Urban Planning) and Master of Engineering Structures.

Australasian Resources (2006–2013)
Wang was employed from 2006 by Australasian Resources, in which Clive Palmer owned a 70% share. He was initially employed as a civil engineer for the company and went on to become a chief executive officer and the managing director, nationally.

Palmer provided cash injections to save Australasian Resources from insolvency, during Wang's directorship. Wang resigned as managing director of Australasian Resources before he assumed his Senate seat.

Political career (2013–2016)
Wang was the lead Senate candidate for the Palmer United Party (PUP), in Western Australia at the 2013 federal election. Wang was announced as having been elected to the Senate, but lost on a recount. The PUP disputed the result of the recount, citing the loss of over 1,300 ballot papers between the original count and the recount.

Senator for Western Australia (2014—2016)
The High Court ordered a fresh 2014 half-Senate election for WA, declaring open the six seats in question. At the new election, Wang won the fifth vacancy with a 12.3 percent vote, an increase of 7.3 percent. He joined the Senate on 1 July 2014.

The PUP won three Senate seats at the 2013 election, including Wang's success at the WA special Senate election. However, within eighteen months, Wang's two Senate colleagues, deputy Senate leader Jacqui Lambie and Senate leader Glenn Lazarus, had resigned from the party to sit as independents, leaving Wang as the only PUP Senator, and one of only two PUP members of the Federal Parliament, the other being party leader Clive Palmer in the House of Representatives. Wang served as the whip of the PUP and then leader before his Senate term was cut short at the 2016 double dissolution election.

Wang courted controversy in 2015 when, shortly after the 26th anniversary of the massacre, he defended the violent suppression of the 1989 Tiananmen Square protests by the government of the People's Republic of China. A few days later Wang spoke again to defend China over territorial claims in the South China Sea.

The PUP ceased to have any political representation in Australia after the 2016 federal election, and Clive Palmer resigned his leadership of the party. Following his electoral defeat, Wang joined the Liberal Party, and there was some speculation that he would seek pre-selection for that party.

References

External links
 Summary of parliamentary voting for Senator Dio Wang on TheyVoteForYou.org.au

1981 births
Living people
Australian civil engineers
Chinese emigrants to Australia
Members of the Australian Senate
Members of the Australian Senate for Western Australia
United Australia Party (2013) members of the Parliament of Australia
Politicians from Nanjing
Australian politicians of Chinese descent
Southeast University alumni
University of Melbourne alumni
21st-century Australian politicians